Anton "Toni" Steurer (born 1 December 1978) is a German extreme sports athlete and non-commissioned officer.

Steurer was born in Oberstdorf. Having climbed the Eiger Nordwand at the age of seventeen, he is one of the youngest mountaineers to have ever done so. He is currently deployed as a medical service soldier and army mountain guide in Kempten, Germany. He is member of the DAV section Oberstaufen and part of the German skimountaineering team. Besides mountain climbing, he also practices biking, skiing and other sports. In 2002, the UN International Year of Mountains, he and Walter Hölzler from Thalkirchdorf climbed the three summits of Piz Palü in a Hat-trick within 24 hours.

Selected results

Mountain running 
 2000:
 2nd, CISM Military World Games, Kamerun (20 January)
 German course record, Tour de Matterhorn (together with Matthias Robl and Christian Kerber)

Ski mountaineering 
 2004:
 3rd, German Cup long distance race
 11th, World Championship relay race (together with Tim Stachel, Gerhard Reithmeier and Stefan Klinger)
 2005:
 1st, German Cup long distance race
 1st, German Championship single
 3rd, European Championship relay race (together with Franz Graßl, Stefan Klinger and Georg Nickaes)
 6th, European Championship single race
 9th, European Championship team race (together with Franz Graßl)
 9th, World Cup race, Salt Lake City
 2006:
 3rd, German Cup single
 5th, World Championship relay race (together with Franz Graßl, Martin Echtler and Georg Nickaes)
 2007:
 4th, European Championship relay race (together with Konrad Lex, Martin Echtler and Stefan Klinger)
 2008:
 1st, German Cup ranking
 2nd, German Championship single
 2nd, German Championship vertical race
 3rd, German Championship team
 6th, World Championship relay race (together with Andreas Strobel, Stefan Klinger and Konrad Lex)
 10th,World Championship combination ranking
 2009
 1st, German Championship single
 1st, German Championship team
 1st, military brigade championship, Hohenzollern stadium in Langdorf (with military equipment)
 9th, European Championship relay race (together with Alexander Schuster, Andreas Strobel and Konrad Lex)
 2011:
 6th, World Championship relay, together with Philipp Reiter, Anton Palzer and Konrad Lex

Patrouille des Glaciers 

 2006: 7th (and 2nd "seniors II" ranking) as well as German record, together with Franz Graßl and Martin Echtler
 2008: 8th (and 6th in the "international men" ranking), together with Franz Graßl and Stefan Klinger

External links 
 Toni Steurer at skimountaineering.com
 Interview (German), 31 January 2006

References and notes 

1978 births
Living people
People from Oberstdorf
Sportspeople from Swabia (Bavaria)
German male ski mountaineers
German Army personnel
Military personnel from Bavaria